In mathematics, the bounded inverse theorem (or inverse mapping theorem) is a result in the theory of bounded linear operators on Banach spaces. 
It states that a bijective bounded linear operator T from one Banach space to another has bounded inverse T−1. It is equivalent to both the open mapping theorem and the closed graph theorem.

Generalization

Counterexample 

This theorem may not hold for normed spaces that are not complete. 
For example, consider the space X of sequences x : N → R with only finitely many non-zero terms equipped with the supremum norm. The map T : X → X defined by

is bounded, linear and invertible, but T−1 is unbounded. 
This does not contradict the bounded inverse theorem since X is not complete, and thus is not a Banach space. 
To see that it's not complete, consider the sequence of sequences x(n) ∈ X given by

converges as n → ∞ to the sequence x(∞) given by

which has all its terms non-zero, and so does not lie in X.

The completion of X is  the space  of all sequences that converge to zero, which is a (closed) subspace of the ℓp space ℓ∞(N), which is the space of all bounded sequences. 
However, in this case, the map T is not onto, and thus not a bijection. To see this, one need simply note that the sequence

See also

References

Bibliography
  
  
  (Section 8.2)
  

Operator theory
Theorems in functional analysis